Siobhan Fallon is an American writer. Her first book You Know When the Men Are Gone published in 2011 is a collection of loosely collected short stories about military wives in Fort Hood, Texas. The book has won national acclaim in America.  A short story of hers, "Tips for a Smooth Transition", was published in the collection Fire and Forget.

References

External links 
 

American women short story writers
21st-century American women writers
Living people
21st-century American short story writers
Year of birth missing (living people)